Marcos Hermenegildo Joaquim Henriques (born 27 May 1981 in Luanda), better known as Miloy, is a retired Angolan football midfielder.

International career
He was a member of the national team, and was selected to the 2006 World Cup. He appeared in 3 World Cup games, 2 coming on as a sub.

National team statistics

References

External links

1981 births
Living people
Footballers from Luanda
Angolan footballers
Angola international footballers
2006 Africa Cup of Nations players
2006 FIFA World Cup players
Association football midfielders
G.D. Interclube players
Santos Futebol Clube de Angola players